Megachile canariensis is a species of bee in the family Megachilidae. It was described by Pérez in 1839.

References

Canariensis
Insects described in 1902